The 1997 Manyi earthquake occurred on November 8 at 10:02 UTC. The epicenter was in Nagqu Prefecture in northern Tibet, China. The focal mechanism indicates a left-lateral strike-slip movement.

See also 
List of earthquakes in 1997
List of earthquakes in China

References

External links 

1997 earthquakes
1997 disasters in China
1997 Manyi
1990s in Tibet
Nagqu
November 1997 events in Asia